Two-faced or Two-Faced
 Two-Faced (Tankard album)
 Two Faced (Burst album)
 "2 Faced", a song by Louise
 Diprosopus or two-faced, a congenital disorder

See also
 Hypocrisy
 True self and false self
 Two-Face, a character in DC comics